Omm ol Emamid (also Romanized as Omm ol Emāmīd; also known as Omm ol Emāmī) is a village in Howmeh-ye Gharbi Rural District, in the Central District of Ramhormoz County, Khuzestan Province, Iran. At the 2006 census, its population was 55, in 11 families.

References 

Populated places in Ramhormoz County